Reshma Thomas is a social worker, and a self-taught artist in India.

She presented a paper about the historical and present influences on the transgender community at a national conference on transgender inequality at Trivandrum, Kerala.

Exhibitions 

 A is for ART at Press Club Trivandrum, July 2015 - an art exhibition in support of Queer Pride Kerala
 Mind Network, an exhibition of art inspired by those afflicted by depression in support on World Mental Health Day), October 2015
 Identity, Lalitha Kala Akademi - organised by Department of Social Justice, Government of Kerala, December 2016
 Imprints David Hall, Kochi, 2017
 The Secret Metamorphosis, Trivandrum, 2018
 The Unheard Voices, Trivandrum, 2019

References

Further reading
Art for the cause of LGBT
Carving a canvas out of tree bark

Artists from Kerala
Indian women painters
Date of birth missing (living people)
Living people
Year of birth missing (living people)